Millie Kirkham (born Mildred Eakes; June 24, 1923 – December 14, 2014) was an American singer who was featured on many classic hit recordings from the mid-1950s through the 1980s.

Early life

Kirkham was born Mildred Eakes in Hermitage, Tennessee. She performed in high school bands in the early 1940s before graduating to session work.

Millie was known as the "Nashville soprano" on numerous hit records and became affectionately known as the fifth member of the Jordanaires. She worked with Patsy Cline, Roy Orbison, Brenda Lee, Eddie Arnold, Elvis Presley, and George Jones ("He Stopped Loving Her Today").

Millie first became noticed in 1957 on Ferlin Husky's #1 country and #4 cross-over hit recording of "Gone", in which Millie sang the angelic background harmony. Elvis asked the Jordanaires, "Who is that lady that sang on 'Gone'?", to which the Jordanaires replied, "That's Millie, Millie Kirkham." They called her and she accepted.

It was Elvis Presley's 1957 recording of  "Blue Christmas" that catapulted Millie to icon status. She was six months pregnant, which was unknown to Elvis, and immediately upon her arrival Elvis said: "someone please get that lady a chair". Their relationship, which included a mutual friendship and love of music, continued for a period of fifteen years and was showcased as part of the highly acclaimed 1970 documentary Elvis, That's The Way It Is.  When Millie left, she was replaced by Kathy Westmoreland.

Her soprano was heard on many of Elvis Presley's recordings such as "My Wish Came True", "The Wonder Of You", "Surrender", "How Great Thou Art", "Polk Salad Annie", "Bridge Over Troubled Water", "Don't", "Just Pretend", "(You're the) Devil in Disguise", "C.C. Rider", “Suspicious Minds” and many others. She also sang with Elvis on many of his movie soundtracks and performed with him on stage in the 1970 documentary, Elvis: That's the Way It Is in Las Vegas.

Along with Sonny James vocal group, The Southern Gentlemen, Millie was a staple on his recordings. Sonny had an unprecedented string of 16 #1 singles in a row and Millie was on a good number of them. She particularly stood out on his hit recordings of "Running Bear", "Take Good Care of Her", "Heaven Says Hello" and "It's Just a Matter of Time".

A longtime fixture in the music community, her credits include numerous radio and television appearances, collaborations with the Jordanaires and the Anita Kerr Singers along with her countless recording sessions in Los Angeles, New York City, Las Vegas and Nashville.

In February 2008 she appeared in "Nashville celebrates Elvis at the Ryman" alongside George Klein (Emcee), Pat Boone, David Briggs, Vince Gill, Amy Grant, Wanda Jackson, Wynonna Judd, Ray Walker of the Jordanaires, Ronnie McDowell, TG Sheppard, BJ Thomas
and former members of J.D. Sumner & the Stamps.

Personal life and death
Kirkham married drummer Doug Kirkham. He died in 1986. She died on December 14, 2014, at the age of 91 in Nashville, Tennessee following a stroke earlier in the week.

Partial discography

References

External links

1923 births
2014 deaths
American women singers
American session musicians
American sopranos
Singers from Nashville, Tennessee
People from Hermitage, Tennessee
21st-century American women